Kinetoplastida (or Kinetoplastea, as a class) is a group of flagellated protists belonging to the phylum Euglenozoa, and characterised by the presence of an organelle with a large massed DNA called kinetoplast (hence the name). The organisms are commonly referred to as "kinetoplastids" or "kinetoplasts" The group includes a number of parasites responsible for serious diseases in humans and other animals, as well as various forms found in soil and aquatic environments. Their distinguishing feature, the presence of a kinetoplast, is an unusual DNA-containing granule located within the single mitochondrion associated with the base of the cell's flagellum (the basal body). The kinetoplast contains many copies of the mitochondrial genome.

The kinetoplastids were first defined by Bronislaw M. Honigberg in 1963 as the members of the flagellated protozoans. They are traditionally divided into the biflagellate Bodonidae and uniflagellate Trypanosomatidae; the former appears to be paraphyletic to the latter. One family of kinetoplastids, the trypanosomatids, is notable as it includes several genera which are exclusively parasitic. Bodo is a typical genus within kinetoplastida and including various common free-living species which feed on bacteria.  Others include Cryptobia and the parasitic Leishmania.

Taxonomy

History

Bronislaw M. Honigberg created the taxonomic names Kinetoplastida and Kinetoplastea in 1963. Since then there is no consensus on the use of either of the two as a definite taxon. Kinetoplastea is more widely used as the class. While Kinetoplastida is mostly used to designate the order, but is also used as a class. Lynn Margulis, who initially accepted Kinetoplastida as an order in 1974, later placed it as a class. Use of Kinetoplastida as an order also creates confusion as there is already an older name Trypanosomatida Kent, 1880, under which the kinetoplastids are most often placed.

Classification

Kinetoplastida is divided into two subclasses - Metakinetoplastina and Prokinetoplastina.

 Family ?Bordnamonadidae Cavalier-Smith 2013
 Family ?Trypanophididae Poche 1911
 Subclass Prokinetoplastina Vickerman 2004
 Order Prokinetoplastida Vickerman 2004
 Family Ichthyobodonidae Isaksen et al. 2007
 Subclass Metakinetoplastina Vickerman 2004
 Order Neobodonida Vickerman 2004
 Family Rhynchomonadidae Cavalier-Smith 2016
 Family Neobodonidae Cavalier-Smith 2016
 Order Parabodonida Vickerman 2004
 Family Parabodonidae Cavalier-Smith 2016 [Cryptobiaceae Poche 1911; Cryptobiidae Vickerman 1976; Trypanoplasmatidae Hartmann & Chagas 1910] 
 Order Bodonida Hollande 1952 emend. Vickerman 1976
 Family Bodonidae Bütschli 1883
 Order Trypanosomatida Kent 1880 stat. n. Hollande 1952 emend. Vickerman 2004
 Family Trypanosomatidae Doflein 1901 [Trypanomorphidae Woodcock 1906]

Morphology
Kinetoplastids are eukaryotic and possess normal eukaryotic organelles, for example the nucleus, mitochondrion, golgi apparatus and flagellum. Along with these universal structures, kinetoplastids have several distinguishing morphological features such as the kinetoplast, sub-pellicular microtubule array and the paraflagellar rod.

Mitochondrion and kinetoplast DNA

The kinetoplast, after which the class is named, contains the mitochondrial genome and is a dense DNA-containing granule within the cell's single mitochondrion. The structure is made up of a network of concatenated circular DNA molecules and their related structural proteins along with DNA and RNA polymerases. The kinetoplast is found at the base of a cell's flagella and is associated to the flagellum basal body by a cytoskeletal structure.

Cytoskeleton
The cytoskeleton of kinetoplastids is primarily made up of microtubules. These make a highly regular array, the sub-pellicular array, which runs parallel just under the cell surface along the long axis of the cell. Other microtubules with more specialised roles, such as the rootlet microtubules, are also present. Kinetoplastids are capable of forming actin microfilaments but their role in the cytoskeleton is not clear. Other cytoskeletal structures include the specialised attachment between the flagellum and the kinetoplast.

Flagella
All kinetoplastids possess at least one flagellum, species in the order trypanosomatida have one and bodonida have two. In kinetoplastids with two flagella most forms have a leading and trailing flagellum, the latter of which may be attached to the side of the cell. The flagella are used for locomotion and attachment to surfaces. The bases of the flagella are found in a specialised pocket structure which is also the location of the cytostome.

Life cycle
Kinetoplastids may be free-living or parasitic. The order trypanosomatida is notable as it includes many genera which are exclusively parasitic. Trypanosomatids may have simple life cycles in a single host or more complex ones which progress through multiple differentiation stages in two hosts. Dramatic morphological changes are possible between lifecycle stages. Diseases caused by members of the order trypanosomatida include sleeping sickness and Chagas disease, caused by species of Trypanosoma, and leishmaniasis, caused by species of Leishmania.

Trypanosoma brucei can undergo meiosis as a likely part of a sexual cycle.  Leishmania major is also capable of a meiotic process that is likely part of a sexual cycle.

Gallery

References

Bibliography
Lumsden, W.H.R. & D.A. Evans (eds.). 1976-1979. Biology of the Kinetoplastida, 2 vols. London: Academic Press.

External links
Tree of Life: Kinetoplastida
KBD -- Kinetoplastid Biology and Disease

Excavata classes